International constitutional law is the study of constitutions in general, and combines aspects of constitutional law, public international law and legal theory. It adds international and transnational treaties to constitutional law. In federal states, subnational constitutions can also be identified. In this multi-level approach to constitutional law there are various relationships between constitutions (network of constitution law).

Relevant articles
 Erika de Wet, "The International Constitutional Order", International and Comparative Law Quarterly 55 (2006), 53–76.
 Ulrich Haltern, "Internationales Verfassungsrecht? Anmerkungen zu einer kopernikanischen Wende", Archiv des öffentlichen Rechts 128 (2003), 511–557. (German)

External links
 International Constitutional Law 
See with regard to comparative constitutional law as part of ICL:
 International Constitutional Law Project 
 International Association of Constitutional Law
 International Journal of Constitutional Law
 Movement for Rule of Law Pakistan

Constitutional law
Constitutional law